The Águilas de Mexicali are a professional baseball based in Mexicali, Baja California, Mexico. They compete in the Mexican Pacific League (LMP), a Mexican winter league. The team plays at Estadio Nido de los Águilas also known simply as "El Nido" (The Nest) with a capacity of 20,000.

History
Baseball has been played in Mexicali since 1914 and several teams have represented the city, the current incarnation of the Águilas was established in 1967 and made its debut in the Mexican Pacific League on 12 October 1976.

They have won the championship four times: in 1985–86 managed by Cananea Reyes, in 1988–89 coached by Dave Machemer, in 1998–99 under Francisco Estrada and most recently in 2016–17 managed by Roberto Vizcarra. The team also won the 1986 Caribbean Series, played in Maracaibo, Venezuela.

Officers
President: Dio Alberto Murillo Rogers
Vice President: Rigoberto Cardenas Valdez
Vice President of Operations: Jose Luiz Rodriguez Escoto
Director, Scouting: David Cardenas Cortes

Roster

Retired numbers
The Águilas de Mexicali have retired the following numbers:

14: Ernesto Escárrega
33: Isidro Márquez
34: Fernando Valenzuela
10: Cananea Reyes
3: Mario Hernández

Notable players
 John Kruk (1986 Caribbean Series Championship team)
 Juan Navarrete (1986 Caribbean Series Championship team)
 Mike Piazza LAD, NYM
 Fernando Valenzuela LAD
 Jonny Gomes TB, CIN
 Ben Guez DET organization
 Gene Richards SD
 Charlie Sands NYY, PIT
 Rudy Seánez CLE, SD, ATL, TEX, BOS, LAD, PHI
 Jeff Samardzija CHC, CHW, SF
 Sergio Romo SF
 Dan Serafini
 Matt Joyce TB
 David Cortés ATL, CLE, COL
 Bubby Rossman PHI

Season by season

References

External links
 Águilas de Mexicali Official site

Águilas de Mexicali
Sport in Mexicali
Baseball teams established in 1976
1976 establishments in Mexico